In  in Northeastern India, the Miju Mishmi, also known as Kaman or Kammaan, are one of the three tribes of the Mishmi people of Tibet and Arunachal Pradesh. Members of this tribe are located in Anjaw and Lohit districts. The Miju clans claim to have come from the Kachin country of Burma. They speak languages of the Midzu branch of Tibeto-Burman.

Origin
The origin of the tribe is unknown, since the tribe does not have written records and relies on stories handed over by the older generations. There have been several opinions put by early Indian historians but none of the facts provided by those historians are reliable.

Dress and ornaments

The men wear a narrow waist cloth which is brought up between the legs and hangs down in an embroidered flap in front. Over this is worn a sleeveless coat reaching halfway down the thighs, the lower half of which is embroidered. The coats and the waist cloth are both woven on an ordinary Indonesian tension loom.

British India silver coins and Yunnan silver coins are used for necklaces and cane rings are sometimes worn below the knee. The hair is worn long and often tied up in a small puggaree.

Women wear long black skirts reaching almost to the ankle, with a little red embroidery round the edges. A gaily embroidered and very abbreviated bodice leaves the waist bare. A dark shawl is usually  thrown over the shoulders. The adornment and patterns on the skirt and shawl have gotten much more intricate and complicated over the time. Thin silver forehead plates and large ear plugs are characteristic, and rich girls often wear numerous silver hoops round the neck.

Religion
Kamans practice animism. Almost every body of nature like the sun, moon, mountains, and rivers are revered as gods. The deities worshipped are Amik (Sun), Matai (Creator), Buroo (God abiding with rivers), Shyuto (God of the mountains), Teemik (God of water springs), Kangam, etc. There are many other malevolent and benevolent deities apart from these who are believed to be protectors or causes of various ailments and problems. All these deities are propitiated from time to time to keep the family and community safe from problems. Tamladu - Taka is celebrated every year around the second week of February to propitiate the hosts of deities for the welfare of village and community. Apart from "Taka" there are many other religious ceremonies associated with the deities. There is "Tulu" for sending the dead spirit to "Kamoulaam" or the domain of the dead, then there is "Apoung" which is conducted to propitiate the host of deities and the dead spirits of the family as well. "Tanoh,Thung and Changrang" are conducted for the welfare of the family society or whatever the chief priest (Kambring) prescribes.

Some of the externals of Mishmi religion show Tibetan influence, but it in no way resembles Buddhism. Nor has the Hinduism of the plains had any influence on it. The tribe has considerable number of named gods, which are rare in most of the tribes of the state. Some Gods are general with many pertaining especially to men and to women, respectively. The religious rituals are carried out by priests (Kambring) and Mishmis spend much time and substance offering sacrifices of appeasement on their instructions. In fact almost all livestock is used only for sacrifice.

Economy
Since ancient times this tribe were good merchants. There is historical proof of this tribe having trade links with Tibet and the Chutiya kingdom. There are many swords, bronze plates, ear rings, bangles, gongs and similar things with Chinese and Tibetan inscriptions. These commodities are held in high value and are hoarded by almost every household as precious possessions used in a host of ceremonies, marriage and business purposes. The major economic activities of the tribe in recent times have been timber and forest resources like medicinal herbs and other forest products, cultivation of cash crops like elaichi and ginger, horticultural crops like oranges, pineapples and other fruits. The production of elaichi, ginger and oranges go in the most remarkable manner and constitute a major portion of the tribe's economy.

The other significant contributors to the economy are government services and government contracts. The use of timber received a big setback in the 1990s when the Supreme court of India banned the felling of trees owing to excessive deforestation in the state. Opium is another significant contributor to the tribe's economy. Despite the ban by the government the production of the drug goes undeterred as the people find no ethical question on the usage of the same. In fact it is considered better than wine most of the time. Animal husbandry is another major source of income in the tribe. Mithuns (a species of bison) is a highly valued animal used prominently as price of bride, meat and host of other trading purposes. Other livestock includes hens, goats, cows which almost every household owns.

Although the people of this tribe are not extremely rich they are not poor either. There were times way back about 200 to 300 years back when there were famines due to failure of crops but lately the economy of the tribe is strong enough. Although it may not reflect in the lifestyle of the people or the government records a close look at the possessions and individual earnings of the people prove the point. Every family has enough resources or means to sustain. Laziness has been the biggest obstacle in the economic growth of the tribe. Men folk are seldom involved in any aggressive pursuit of economy, it is the women in the tribe who play a dominating role in any economic activities. The recent 20 to 30 years have seen a massive growth of rich people in the tribe owing to exposure with outside world. The agricultural and horticultural productions having got potential passage to be supplied to open market outside of the state, it has contributed immensely to the affluence of the tribesmen.

Notable Miju Mishmis
 Kalikho Pul, Chief Minister of Arunachal Pradesh

References

 J.P. Mills, Mishmis of the Lohit Valley, Assam, The Journal of the Royal Anthropological Institute of Great Britain and Ireland, Vol. 82, No. 1 (January - June,1952),pp. 1–12

External links 
 Ethnologue.com
 Nic.in, Anjaw district

Indigenous peoples of South Asia
Tribes of Arunachal Pradesh
Tribes of India